C.K. Raulji is an Indian politician from the state of Gujarat. He is a two term member of the Gujarat Legislative Assembly.

Career
Raulji is a member of the Bharatiya Janata Party (BJP).

He is a second-term member of the Gujarat Legislative Assembly. He represents the Godhara (Vidhan Sabha constituency), having been elected from there in 2012 and 2017. He joined Bharatiya Janata Party from Indian National Congress in October 2017.

CK Raulji was a member of the panel which reviewed the application for commutation filed by the convicts sentenced for gang rape and murder in the Bilkis Bano case. The panel recommended acceptance of the plea for commutation after the convicts had served fourteen years in prison. The convicts were released after 14 years in prison due to this panel's recommendation.

Personal life
Raulji is married to Smt. Jaynaben Raulji. The couple have two children.

On 26 September 2017, a leopard was seen in the vicinity of Raulji's residence, and was captured three days later.

On, 19th August 2022, Raulji had controversially described the conduct of the 11 convicts in the Bilkis Bano case in jail as good. He said, “I do not know if they have committed the crime or not.” Raulji added, “They are Brahmins and Brahmins are known to have good sanskar.”

References

https://www.shethepeople.tv/news/bjp-ck-raulji-statement-bilkis-bano-case/

External links
Gujarat Legislative Assembly 

Living people
People from Panchmahal district
Year of birth missing (living people)
Bharatiya Janata Party politicians from Gujarat
Indian National Congress politicians from Gujarat
Janata Dal politicians
Rashtriya Janata Party politicians